Ballintober North, also called Ballintober East, is a barony in County Roscommon, Republic of Ireland.

Etymology
Ballintober North is named after Ballintober town, which it does not actually contain. That town is located in Castlereagh barony.

Geography
Ballintober North is located in the northeast of County Roscommon, bounded by the River Shannon to the east, an area with many lakes, including Lough Boderg and Kilglass Lough.

History
This area was the ancient kingdom of Baghna, ruled by the Ó Fiannaigh (Feeney) tribe. After them, the Hanleys (Ó hAinle) were the landlords of the area before losing their land in the mid-17th century.

Its northern extreme was the plain of Caradh (modern Carranadoe), referred to in the topographical poem Tuilleadh feasa ar Éirinn óigh (Giolla na Naomh Ó hUidhrín, d. 1420).

It was originally a single barony with Ballintober South; they were separated by 1841.

Wealthy landowning families in the 19th century were the Kings of Charlestown House, the Waldrons, and the Goffs.

List of settlements
Below is a list of settlements in Ballintober North:
Roosky
Tarmonbarry

References

Baronies of County Roscommon